Jacob Cornelis de Zeeuw (December 19, 1954, Numansdorp) is a sailor from the Netherlands, who represented his country at the 1976 Summer Olympics in Kingston, Ontario, Canada as substitute for the Dutch 470 team of Joop van Werkhoven and Robert van Werkhoven.

Sailing career
De Zeeuw started in the 420 with  Bas de Koning as helmsman. In this class De Zeeuw took the Dutch Championship 1971. De Zeeuw made the stap into the 470 but did not made the selection. However De Zeeuw with his brother worked as sparrings partners for the Van Werkhoven bros. This resulted in De Zeeuw's selection for the 1976 Olympics. After the Olympics De Zeeuw took the European Championship in the Prindle 16 catamaran.

Later De Zeeuw specialized in National and International keelboat classes like Centaur and Yngling. De Zeeuw took the 1995 Dutch Championship in the Olympic Soling with Leo Determan and helmsman Rudy den Outer.

Professional life
De Zeeuw studied Physical therapy on the IHBO, Vlissingen. As Physiotherapist De Zeeuw supported the Swedish Speed Skating Team of coach Kees Verkerk.
Nowadays De Zeeuw teaches Dutch as a second language.

Sources

 
 
 

Living people
1954 births
People from Binnenmaas
Dutch male sailors (sport)
470 class sailors
Yngling class sailors
Soling class sailors
Olympic sailors of the Netherlands
Sportspeople from South Holland